2009 Ehime F.C. season

Competitions

Player statistics

Other pages
 J. League official site

Ehime F.C.
Ehime FC seasons